Anabel Englund (born September 1, 1992) is an American singer, songwriter, record producer and DJ from Southern California. She is best known for her collaborative work with electronic and house music artists such as Hot Natured and MK.

Her debut album, Messing with Magic, was released in December 2020, with a deluxe edition dropping a few months later. It consisted of a compilation of all the singles released by Englund throughout that year under Ultra Music and AREA10, and featured "So Hot", "Picture Us", "Underwater" and "Waiting for You" which reached number one on U.S. dance radio.

Early life
Born in New York City and raised in Los Angeles to a musical family, her father is American actor and singer Morgan Englund, her grandfather was the director-producer George Englund and her grandmother, Academy Award-winning actress Cloris Leachman. Her great-grandmother Mabel Albertson and Mabel's famous brother, Jack Albertson, were also actors and came from a Jewish family.

Leachman inspired her granddaughter to become a singer. "My grandmother would make me sing in front of her actor friends but I'd be so shy, I'd have to face away," she recalls. Englund regularly cites her major influence as being Madonna.

Career
She made her first foray as a performer at the Christian youth group she attended aged 16, and became a singer-songwriter at Disney-owned US TV network ABC Family supplying theme songs and other material for television shows. During 2010 and 2011, she wrote and performed largely piano-driven ballads both on her own and as part of a duo named Suburban Nightlife. In late 2012, she met producers Lee Foss and Jamie Jones, and, together with Marc Kinchen (MK), she collaborated on the song "Electricity," released through Hot Creations. The house track was lauded in the electronic music community and added to rotation on BBC Radio 1's Essential Mix playlist in January 2013.

The success of the track raised Englund's profile and she took part in the sessions that would become the 2013 album Different Sides of the Sun by British-American electronic/house group Hot Natured. She featured on three tracks: "Reverse Skydiving," "Mercury Rising" and "Emerald City." Remixes of these songs also highlighted Englund's contribution, while "Reverse Skydiving" reached number fifty-six on the Official UK Singles Chart. Englund then performed with Hot Natured at major music festivals around the world and also collaborated with Kinchen and Foss to form the Pleasure State project. Their debut EP Ghost In the System was released by Hot Creations on December 1, 2014. Earlier that year, Englund revealed she had signed a record deal with Three Six Zero, in partnership with Warner Bros. and Warner/Chappell Music, and was working on her debut solo album. She also signed a modeling contract with Britain's leading agency Models 1.

In October 2016, Defected Records announced they would be releasing Englund's debut solo single, "London Headache," on November 14, 2016, described as a "piece of alternative pop/house, with elements of disco running throughout [...] coupled with her deeply personal lyrics". Englund also begun her own event that same year titled Gari Safari, consisting in a series of live shows. She then continued to feature in numerous other tracks by various DJs and performing around the world in multiple events and festivals. In 2019, Englund signed with MK's AREA10 imprint in partnership with Ultra Music and begun releasing several singles. In May 2020, her single "So Hot" reached number one on U.S. dance radio for eight consecutive weeks. She topped the chart again with her single "Picture Us" in October 2020, also reaching number one on Billboard′s Dance/Mix Show Airplay. Englund's debut album Messing with Magic was released on December 11, 2020. In April 2021, "Underwater" became Englund's third song to top U.S. dance radio as well as her second number one on Billboard′s Dance/Mix Show Airplay chart. A deluxe version of Messing with Magic was released on May 21, 2021, and included her fourth number one on U.S. dance radio, "Waiting for You".

Discography

Studio albums

Extended plays

Singles
 2016: "London Headache"
 2018: "So Hot"
 2019: "Messing with Magic" (with Jamie Jones)
 2020: "See the Sky"
 2020: "Warm Disco" 
 2020: "Picture Us"
 2020: "Underwater" 
 2021: "Waiting for You" 
 2021: "Midnight Rapture"
 2022: "Lightwaves" 
 2022: "Need Me Right"

Promotional singles
 2012: "Hard to Forget" (with Tyler Blackburn)
 2012: "Once a Year"
 2014: "Be With Me"

Guest appearances
 2011: "Gone" (The Good Boys featuring Anabel Englund)
 2012: "In Time" (PeaceTreaty featuring Anabel Englund)
 2012: "Come Alive" (PatrickReza featuring Anabel Englund)
 2012: "Electricity" (Lee Foss and MK featuring Anabel Englund)
 2013: "Falling" (Human Life featuring Anabel Englund)
 2013: "Nice Day" (Jez Dior featuring Anabel Englund)
 2013: "Reverse Skydiving" (Hot Natured featuring Anabel Englund)
 2013: "Mercury Rising" (Hot Natured featuring Anabel Englund)
 2013: "Emerald City" (Hot Natured featuring Anabel Englund)
 2014: "El Diablo" (Human Life featuring Anabel Englund)
 2014: "Ghost in the System" 
 2014: "Subject Matter" 
 2015: "Talk to Me" (Human Life featuring Anabel Englund)
 2015: "About U" (Tommy Trash and Burns) [Uncredited guest vocals]
 2017: "Blue Is The Distance" (Lee Foss featuring Ali Love and Anabel Englund)
 2017: "Cha Cha (Velvet Version)" (Tâches featuring Anabel Englund)
 2017: "Rising" (Gari Recs featuring Anabel Englund, Human Life, Matt Ossentjuk and Mont Blvck)
 2018: "Call U Rite Back" (Rybo featuring Anabel Englund)
 2018: "Just for the High" (Rybo featuring Anabel Englund)
 2018: "Old Times" (Amtrac featuring Anabel Englund)
 2018: "Use Me Up" (CID featuring Anabel Englund)
 2019: "Something New" (Rybo featuring Anabel Englund)
 2019: "Brazil" (Lee Foss featuring Eli Brown and Anabel Englund)
 2020: "Need Me" (Jaded featuring Anabel Englund)
 2020: "Kiss From God" (Dirty South) [Uncredited guest vocals]
 2020: "Only the Gods" 
 2020: "Better on My Own" 
 2020: "Eyes on  Me" 
 2020: "Thunder & Lightning" 
 2020: "I Have Synthed" 
 2021: "Break Away" 
 2021: "Take My Time" 
 2021: "Infinity" (Blackhill) [Uncredited guest vocals]
 2021: "Deja Vu" (Oliver Heldens featuring Anabel Englund)
 2021: "Coming Home" (Vintage Culture and Leftwing : Kody featuring Anabel Englund)
 2022: "Low"

Music videos

Awards and nominations

Notes

References

External links

1992 births
21st-century American singers
American dance musicians
American women singer-songwriters
Living people
Singers from Los Angeles
Singers from New York City
American people of Czech descent
American people of Jewish descent
American women in electronic music
21st-century American women singers
Singer-songwriters from California
Singer-songwriters from New York (state)